Alexei (or Alexe) Mateevici (March 27, 1888 – August 24, 1917) was one of the most prominent Romanian poets in Moldova.

Biography 

He was born in the town Căinari, in Eastern Bessarabia, which was part of the Russian Empire, now in the Republic of Moldova. He grew up in Zaim, Căușeni. He studied at the theological school of Chișinău, and published his first poems (Țăranii (Peasants), Eu cânt (I sing), Țara (The Country)) in the newspaper Basarabia, where he also published two articles on Moldavian folklore. Mateevici later published several articles on religion in Moldavia.

Mateevici went on to study at the Theological Academy of Kiev, from which he graduated in 1914. In that year he married Teodora Borisovna Novitski. He returned to Chișinău, and became a Greek language teacher at the theological school. In the summer of 1917 he wrote  the lyrics for Limba noastră (Our Language), which has been the national anthem of Moldova since 1994. He also volunteered as a World War One Romanian front prest, at Mărășești great battle.

He died a month later of epidemic typhus, and was buried at the Chișinău Central Cemetery. The street leading to the cemetery now bears his name.

Honours
 Monument to Simion Murafa, Alexei Mateevici and Andrei Hodorogea, opened in 1933

References

External links 
Museum Alexei Mateevici from Cainari

 

1888 births
1917 deaths
People from Căușeni District
People from Bendersky Uyezd
Moldovan poets
Male poets
Romanian people of Moldovan descent
Romanian poets
Romanian male poets
Romanian nationalists
National anthem writers
Deaths from typhus
Eastern Orthodox Christians from Moldova
Members of the Romanian Orthodox Church
Poets from the Russian Empire
Moldovan male writers